The NFL playoffs following the 1969 NFL season determined the league's representative in Super Bowl IV.

This was the last NFL playoff tournament before the AFL–NFL merger and the last awarding of the Ed Thorp Memorial Trophy to the NFL champion, which was introduced in 1934.

Tournament bracket
The four-team postseason format was introduced for the  season, when the NFL expanded to 16 teams and realigned into four division with four teams each.

Within each conference, the two division winners qualified for the playoffs. In the first round, the Capitol winner met the Century winner in the Eastern Conference game, while the Coastal and Central played for the Western Conference title. The winners of the two conference games advanced to the NFL Championship Game to compete for the NFL league title and the right to face the American Football League champion in Super Bowl IV. The losers of the conference championship games played in the Playoff Bowl, a third place game at the Orange Bowl in Miami, Florida; the Playoff Bowl of January 1970 was its tenth and final edition.

In , the hosts were the Capitol and Central division winners for the conference championships (first round), and the Western Conference for the championship game. This gave home field advantage to the Central Division winner, the Minnesota Vikings (12–2), which had the league's best record. The previous year's playoff hosts were Century, Coastal, and Eastern, respectively, and 1967 was like 1969. All three playoff games in 1969 were hosted by the team with the better regular season record.

Conference Championships

Saturday, December 27, 1969

Western Conference: Minnesota Vikings 23, Los Angeles Rams 20

Three weeks prior to this game, the teams met in Los Angeles in a battle between the undefeated (11–0) Rams and the 10–1 Vikings. The Vikings won that game 20–13. The rematch was played in the cold and snow of Minnesota. Despite committing more turnovers (3 to 1) and only gaining 20 more total yards (275-255), the Vikings managed to edge out the Rams for their first postseason win in franchise history.

In the game in L.A., the Viking defense shut down the Rams' wide receivers and outside running game, so in this game, the Rams attacked the middle of the Viking defense and neutralized the Viking pass rush with short quick passes to the tight ends. The Rams defense held Minnesota's high powered offense in check, with the "Fearsome Foursome" defensive line harassing Viking QB Joe Kapp.  Early on, the momentum seemed to be in LA's favor.  Rams safety Richie Petitbon recovered a fumble from fullback Bill Brown that gave his team a first down on the Minnesota 45-yard line.  On the next play, it appeared that the Vikings took a quick lead as Carl Eller intercepted a Roman Gabriel pass and returned for a touchdown but the score was nullified on an offside penalty on Alan Page.  Taking advantage of their second chance, running back Larry Smith gained 19 yards on three carries, and Gabriel eventually finished the drive with a 3-yard touchdown pass to tight end Bob Klein.  The Vikings quickly stormed back, with Kapp completing four consecutive passes on a 10-play, 75-yard drive.  Three of the completions were to receiver Gene Washington for 49 total yards, including a 27-yard reception that gave the Vikings the ball on the Rams' 4-yard line.  Dave Osborn ran for a touchdown on the next play, tying the score at 7 with a little over 3 minutes left in the first quarter.

LA moved the ball effectively on their next drive, but it ended on a missed 38-yard field goal attempt by Bruce Gossett.  The next time they got the ball, they did much better, taking up the majority of the second quarter, including a 13-yard run by Gabriel to convert a third down.  Gossett finished the drive with a 20-yard field goal to put the Rams up 10-7 with 4:30 left before halftime.  Following a punt, Gabriel led his team back for more points.  This time he completed passes to tight end Billy Truax for gains of 18 and 16 yards before finishing the 13-play, 65-yard drive with a 2-yard touchdown pass to Truax.  The Rams went into halftime leading 17-7, having scored on three of their four first half possessions.

In the second half, Viking coach Bud Grant adjusted his defense to stop the Ram tight ends, and his "Purple People Eaters" continued to punish the Ram running game. They also got increasing pressure on Gabriel. On offense, Grant neutralized the Ram pass rush by having QB Kapp run the ball, either on designed plays like quarterback draws or roll outs, or by instructing him to take off and run at the first sign of pressure. Kapp began frustrating the Rams with runs; this threat caused their pass rush to be less aggressive.

After forcing the Rams to punt for the first time in the game on the opening possession of the second half, Kapp completed a 41-yard pass to Washington on the LA 12-yard line.  After a Rams penalty and a 5-yard run by Kapp, Osborn finished the drive with a 1-yard touchdown run that cut Minnesota's deficit to 17-14.  However, Minnesota's comeback attempt suffered major setbacks over the next few drives against a punishing effort from the Rams defense.  The next time the Vikings got the ball, they drove deep into Rams territory, only to have Kapp throw an interception to safety Ed Meador on the LA 4-yard line.  Meador fumbled the ball during the return, but linebacker Jim Purnell recovered it.  After an LA punt, Kapp was intercepted again, this time by Petitbon, who returned the ball 4 yards to the Vikings' 36. Once again, the Viking defense bent but didn't break, stopping the Rams inside the 10 yard line and making them settle for a 27-yard Gossett field goal. So instead of being down 24–14, it was only 20–14 going into the fourth quarter.

Kapp subsequently marched the Vikings 65 yards downfield, completing three passes for 40 yards and going the final 2 yards himself as Minnesota took its first lead of the game, 21–20, with 8:24 on the clock. Then the Viking defense took over.  After their special teams unit tackled returner Ron Smith on the 12-yard line during the ensuing kickoff, Carl Eller sacked Gabriel in the end zone for a safety, giving the Vikings a 23–20 lead and the ball. But the Rams defense held, and 1969 NFL MVP Gabriel began to march the Rams down field in the last two minutes. As they crossed midfield, it appeared the Rams might get the tying field goal or winning touchdown, but a Gabriel pass was tipped and intercepted at the Viking 40-yard line by Alan Page with 30 seconds left, allowing his team to run out the clock and win.

Gabriel completed 22/30 passes for 150 yards and two touchdowns, with 1 interception, while also rushing for 26 yards.  Larry Smith was the top rusher of the game with 11 carries for 60 yards, and he caught 6 passes for 36.  Kapp completed 12/19 passes for 196 yards with 2 interceptions, while also rushing for 41 yards and a touchdown.  Washington caught 4 passes for 90 yards.

Sunday, December 28, 1969

Eastern Conference: Cleveland Browns 38, Dallas Cowboys 14

For the second year in a row, Cleveland eliminated Dallas from the playoffs, this time outgaining them in total yards 344 to 217 and forcing 3 turnovers, without losing any themselves.

Cleveland dominated the first half, holding Dallas to just 17 plays and 39 total yards.  They had to punt after taking the opening kickoff, but Don Cockroft's high short kick ended up bouncing off the leg of Dallas lineman Rayfield Wright and linebacker Bob Matheson recovered for the Browns on the Cowboys' 34-yard line.  Cleveland then drove to their first score on a 2-yard touchdown run by Bo Scott.  The Browns later increased their lead to 14–0 by driving 55 yards to score on Bill Nelsen's 6-yard touchdown pass to tight end Milt Morin.  Cockroft missed two field goal attempts, but just before the end of the half, Ron Widby's 27-yard punt gave the Browns the ball on the Cowboys' 34-yard line, setting up Cockroft's 29-yard field goal that gave Cleveland a 17–0 halftime lead.

Early in the third quarter, Browns linebacker Jim Houston intercepted Craig Morton's pass and returned it 35 yards to the Dallas 19, leading to Scott's second 2-yard touchdown run to make the score 24–0.  This time Dallas was able to respond, driving 72 yards in 12 plays, including a 26-yard catch by tight end Pettis Norman, to score on Morton's 2-yard touchdown run.

However, 24–7 was as close as the score would get.  In the 4th quarter, a 39-yard burst by Browns running back Leroy Kelly (the longest gain of the day for either team) set up his 1-yard touchdown plunge to give the Browns a 31–7 lead.  Dallas had a chance to score after a punt play when Cockroft bobbled a low snap from rookie center Chuck Reynolds and was tackled on the Browns' 22-yard line.  But faced with 4th down from the 18 after 7 plays, Morton threw a short pass intended for Walt Garrison that was intercepted by rookie cornerback Walt Sumner, who took off for an 88-yard touchdown return.

The only notable thing remaining in the game would be the playoff debut of 27-year old rookie Dallas quarterback Roger Staubach.  He got off to a shaky start, throwing an interception that was eliminated by a Browns holding penalty, but managed to lead the Cowboys to a touchdown, rushing three times for 22 yards and completing passes to Lance Rentzel for gains of 14 and 22 yards before finding him in the end zone for a 5-yard scoring pass.

Nelsen completed 18/27 passes for 219 yards and a touchdown.  His top receiver was Paul Warfield, who caught 8 passes for 99 yards.  Kelly had 66 rushing yards, 10 receiving yards, and a touchdown.  Morton was held to just 8/24 completions for 92 yards, with two interceptions that were both converted into Cleveland touchdowns.

NFL Championship Game: Minnesota Vikings 27, Cleveland Browns 7

Cleveland had lost the previous season's NFL title game 34–0, and this time fared little better.  The Vikings dominated the game, racking up 381 yards without losing a single turnover, while Cleveland gained just 268 yards and turned the ball over three times.

The Vikings took a lead just four minutes into the first quarter, driving 70 yards for a touchdown in 8 plays. The key play of the drive was a pass from Joe Kapp to receiver Gene Washington that was nearly 5 yards short of the mark. Despite the short throw, Washington was able to come back and haul it in for a 33-yard gain to the Browns' 24-yard line. Two plays later, Dave Osborn's 12-yard run moved the ball to the 7. Then two plays after that, Bill Brown accidentally slipped and bumped into Kapp while moving up to take a handoff, but Kapp simply kept the ball himself and ran it 7 yards for a touchdown.

The situation never got any better for Cleveland.  The next time Minnesota got the ball, Erich Barnes slipped while in one-on-one coverage with Washington, enabling him to catch a pass from Kapp and take off for a 75-yard touchdown completion.  Near the end of the first quarter, Browns running back Leroy Kelly lost a fumble that was recovered by linebacker Wally Hilgenberg on the Cleveland 43.  Kapp then completed a 12-yard pass to Washington before Fred Cox finished the drive with a 30-yard field goal, putting the Vikings up 17–0.  Later in the second period, Hilgenberg snuffed out a Cleveland scoring threat by intercepting a pass from Bill Nelsen on the Vikings' 33-yard line.  Minnesota subsequently drove 67 yards in 8 plays.  Kapp started the drive with a pair of completions to John Henderson for 17 total yards, while Osborn broke off a 16-yard run and ended up finishing the drive with a 20-yard touchdown burst, giving the Vikings a 24–0 lead with 4:46 left in the first half.  Cleveland responded with a drive to the Vikings' 17, but turned the ball over on downs when Nelsen overthrew receiver Gary Collins in the end zone on 4th and 3.

The third quarter was mostly uneventful, other than Cox's 32-yard field goal that gave Minnesota a 27–0 lead after an 11-play, 80-yard drive.  The most noteworthy play was a 13-yard scramble by Kapp in which he plowed into 240-pound Browns linebacker Jim Houston so hard that Houston was knocked out of the game.  In the 4th quarter, Cleveland finally got on the board when a diving 18-yard reception by Paul Warfield set up Nelsen's 3-yard touchdown pass to Collins.  There were still 13 minutes on the clock at this point, but there would be no more scoring.  The Vikings had a drive to the Cleveland 2-yard line, but decided to let the clock run out instead of going for another score.

Kapp completed just 7/13 passes, but threw for 169 yards and a touchdown, while also rushing for 57 yards and another score.  Osborn rushed 18 times for 108 yards and a touchdown.  Washington had 120 yards and a touchdown on just 3 receptions.  Kelly was the Browns' top rusher with 80 yards, while also catching two passes for 17.  Nelsen completed just 17 of 33 passes for 181 yards, with one touchdown and two interceptions.

References

1969
Playoffs
NFL playoffs
NFL playoffs